Mykola Kindratovych Voronyi (December 6, 1871, – June 7, 1938) was a Ukrainian writer, poet, actor, director, and political activist.

Born in Rostov-on-Don in the Yekaterinoslav Governorate, he acted in the troupes of Marko Kropyvnytskyi and the Ruska Besida Theatre. Voronyi was a founding member of the Central Council of Ukraine. He was also a founder of the Ukrainian National Theater in 1917.

In 1938 he was executed in Odesa by the NKVD troika on accusations to belong to the Ukrainian militarist and nationalist organization.

References 

1871 births
1938 deaths
People from Yekaterinoslav Governorate
Members of the Central Council of Ukraine
Revolutionary Ukrainian Party politicians
Ukrainian writers
Ukrainian poets
Ukrainian male stage actors
Ukrainian Discourse Theatre
Translators of William Shakespeare
Great Purge victims from Ukraine
Soviet rehabilitations